Adepero Oduye (born January 11, 1978) is an American actress, director, singer, and writer. She is known for Pariah (2011), 12 Years a Slave (2013), The Big Short (2015), and Widows (2018).

Life and career
Adepero Oduye was born in Brooklyn, New York, one of seven children of Nigerian parents. Although she graduated pre-med from Cornell University, she decided to pursue her passion for acting upon graduation.

Oduye's breakout role came in 2011 when she starred in Dee Rees' critically acclaimed and award-winning independent film Pariah, for which she received several awards and a nomination for Best Female Lead at the Independent Spirit Awards. During her Golden Globe acceptance speech for The Iron Lady, Meryl Streep mentioned some of her favorite performances of the year, highlighting Oduye in Pariah. The following year, she joined an all-star cast in the Steel Magnolias television remake as Annelle Dupuy-Desoto, a role originated by Daryl Hannah.

In 2013, Oduye co-starred alongside Chiwetel Ejiofor in Steve McQueen's historical drama 12 Years a Slave, winner of the 2014 Academy Award for Best Picture. She also appeared in Ava DuVernay's short film The Door part of Miu Miu's ad campaign known as The Women's Tales. In 2014, she made her directorial debut with Breaking In, a short film about a young black man's first time being stopped and frisked by the NYPD, based on her brother's early experience. The film has garnered several film festival acknowledgments and awards.

After several lead roles in regional theater productions, including Eclipsed and The Bluest Eye, Oduye made her Broadway debut opposite Cicely Tyson in Horton Foote's The Trip To Bountiful.

In 2015, Oduye co-starred with Steve Carell in Adam McKay's comedy-drama The Big Short, which won the Academy Award for Best Adapted Screenplay. In 2017, she co-starred in the drama thriller The Dinner, with Richard Gere. In 2018, she appeared in films Geostorm and Widows. In 2019, she played activist Nomsa Brath in the Ava DuVernay's miniseries When They See Us.

Filmography

Film

Television

Features
 Vanity Fair – Hollywood Issue Cover (2012)
 The New York Times – Great Performances (2012)
 Time – Great Performances (2012)
 W – Best Performances issue (February 2012)

References

External links

1970s births
Living people
21st-century American actresses
Actresses from New York City
American people of Nigerian descent
African-American actresses
20th-century African-American women singers
Cornell University alumni
Musicians from Brooklyn
American television actresses
American film actresses
American musical theatre actresses
American stage actresses
21st-century American women singers
21st-century American singers
Year of birth missing (living people)
21st-century African-American women singers